Bosnia and Herzegovina competed at the 2011 World Championships in Athletics from August 27 – September 4 in Daegu, South Korea.
A team of 2 athletes was
announced to represent the country
in the event.

Results

CHICO
Field events

Women
Track and road events

See also
 Bosnia and Herzegovina at the World Championships in Athletics

References

External links
Official local organising committee website
Official IAAF competition website

Nations at the 2011 World Championships in Athletics
World Championships in Athletics
2011